Michael Baker may refer to:

Michael Baker (politician) (1957–2009), Canadian politician
Michael A. Baker (born 1953), NASA astronaut
Michael Baker (American football) (born 1970), American football player
Michael Baker (physician) (born 1943), Canadian cancer researcher
Michael Baker (epidemiologist), New Zealand epidemiologist
Michael Conway Baker (born 1937), Canadian composer
Mickey Baker (1925–2012), American guitarist
Mike Baker (singer) (1963–2008), lead vocalist for the American progressive metal band Shadow Gallery
Mike Baker (journalist) (1957–2012), BBC broadcaster
Mike Baker (CIA officer) (born 1961), American-British former officer with the Central Intelligence Agency
Mike Baker, the full name of Thatcher (Rainbow Six Siege), a fictional character from Tom Clancy's Rainbow Six Siege by Ubisoft